Hung Tzu-kuei (born 1 June 1993) is a Taiwanese footballer who currently plays as a defender for the Chinese Taipei national football team.

Life and club career
Hung is of Paiwan background. He studied at Kaohsiung's Alian Junior High School and Lujhu Senior High. After leaving school, he joined the army for family reason, even though he was offered a place at the National Taiwan University of Sport. However, he decided that the army life is not for him, and returned to study at the University and joined the football team of the university.

He joined Taichung Futuro in 2019.

International career
Hung had been previously selected for U19 national team.

Hung made his senior international debut for Chinese Taipei on October 8th 2016, in a 2019 Asian Cup qualifying play-off match against Timor-Leste.

References

1993 births
Living people
Taiwanese footballers
Chinese Taipei international footballers
Taiwan Football Premier League players
Taichung Futuro F.C. players
Association football defenders
Paiwan people